Frank Pepe Pizzeria Napoletana, commonly known as Frank Pepe's or simply Pepe's, is a popular pizza restaurant in the Wooster Square neighborhood of New Haven, Connecticut, at 163 Wooster Street. Opened in 1925, it is one of the oldest and best known pizzerias in the United States.

Frank Pepe 
Pepe's was founded in 1925 by Frank Pepe (April 15, 1893 – September 6, 1969), an Italian immigrant. Pepe was born in Maiori, Italy, and immigrated to New Haven in 1909 when he was a teenager. The quintessential Wooster Square Italian immigrant took a job at a New Haven factory, but wasn't fond of continuing there. During World War I, Pepe went back to Italy to fight for his native country. Upon returning, he soon landed a job working at a bakery on Wooster Street.  Pepe began walking through the Wooster Square market and sold his "tomato pies" off of a special headdress. After saving enough money, he was able to buy a wagon from which he sold his pizzas. He was so successful that he was eventually able to take over his employer's business and turn it into the first "Frank Pepe Pizzeria Napoletana" on June 16, 1925. Frank Pepe died on September 6, 1969.

Restaurant history 
Pepe's originated the New Haven-style thin-crust apizza (closely related to Neapolitan-style Italian pizza) which he baked in a coal-fired brick pizza oven. Originally, Frank Pepe only made two varieties of pizza: the "tomato pie" (tomatoes with grated  pecorino romano cheese, garlic, oregano, and olive oil) and the other with the addition of anchovy.

The piece of land which Pepe's restaurant sat on was owned by the Boccamiello family. They later made Frank Pepe leave so that they could start their own pizzeria at the establishment, which they renamed The Spot. Pepe moved his restaurant to its current location next door to The Spot in 1936. The Pepe family later bought back The Spot from the Boccamiello family in 1981 and it now serves the same menu as the older restaurant.

In the alleyway between The Spot and Pepe's, Boccamiello's nephew Bear would open clams and sell them on the half shell to passersby. Pepe's restaurant began serving littleneck clams on the half shell at the bar. It was only a matter of time before he decided to put the clams on the pizza. The white clam pie is just crust, olive oil, oregano, grated cheese, chopped garlic, and fresh littleneck clams. The restaurant will serve the pizza with or without mozzarella cheese, but they try to discourage customers from ordering it with mozzarella because they feel that it makes the pizza too heavy and rich. They are also adamant on using freshly shucked clams as opposed to canned clams; if fresh clams are not available then they will not serve the white clam pie. Three men are employed by Pepe's just for shucking the clams on location. Since its invention, the white clam pie has become the signature pizza of pizzerias in New Haven.

Since opening a Chestnut Hill, Massachusetts location in 2015, Pepe's has expanded to fifteen locations in Connecticut, New York, Massachusetts, Rhode Island, Maryland, Virginia and Florida.

Menu 

All of Pepe's locations feature the same menu. Since 1925, Pepe's has exclusively served Foxon Park bottled sodas from East Haven, Connecticut. The restaurant offers soda, beer, wine, and several varieties of pizzas and toppings.

Ovens 
All Pepe's ovens are coal-fired and built in exactly the same manner from brick, based on the original.

Locations 
Pepe's has expanded outside of New Haven as a small family owned chain. Nine relatives are co-owners of the chain, including grandsons Gary Bimonte (1959–2021) and Francis Rosselli. All locations feature the same green and white design of their building and fixtures, serve on the square pizza pans and use the same suppliers for their ingredients.

Competition 
Another Wooster Street pizza restaurant, Sally's Apizza, was founded by Pepe's nephew Sal Consiglio in 1938. Sally's and Pepe's have a long friendly rivalry and pizza fans are divided over which serves the better pizza.  Frank Sinatra, for example, was a fan of Sally's, while President Ronald Reagan preferred Pepe's.

Business 
Pepe's is also a major tourist attraction in New Haven.
 1999: Pepe's was named to the James Beard Foundation's list of "America's Classics".
 2006: Pepe's is acknowledged on the History Channel's American Eats show as the originator of New Haven-style pizza in 1925.
 2009: Pepe's was named the "Best Pizza on Earth" by The Guardian.
 2009: Alan Richman, food correspondent for GQ magazine, names the tomato pizza at Pepe's the twelfth best pizza in the country in the May issue.
 2009: Connecticut Magazine named Pepe's the best in the state.
 2010: Frank Pepe Pizzeria Napoletana was inducted into that Connecticut Hospitality Hall of Fame on December 7, 2010.
 2013: Zagat said that the white clam pizza at Pepe's was the best pizza in the state, in an article naming the best pizza in each state.
 2013: The website The Daily Meal named the white clam pizza at Pepe's the best pizza in the country.
 2014: The Daily Meal named the white clam pizza at Pepe's the best pizza in the country for the second year in a row.

Documentary 
Pepe's is one of three pizza restaurants featured in the documentary film Pizza A Love Story, directed by Gorman Bechard.  The film had its world premiere at IFFBoston in April 2019. The film was released on DVD and pay-per-view on September 29, 2020.

See also 

 List of Italian restaurants
 List of pizza chains of the United States

References

External links 
 
 Frank Pepe's review at Slice
 Roadfood.com listing, with review by Michael Stern

Pizzerias in the United States
Buildings and structures in New Haven, Connecticut
Economy of New Haven, Connecticut
Italian-American cuisine
Italian restaurants in the United States
Italian-American culture in Connecticut
Restaurants in Connecticut
Tourist attractions in New Haven, Connecticut
Restaurants established in 1925
James Beard Foundation Award winners
1925 establishments in Connecticut